The Speaker of the Shura Council of Egypt was the presiding officer of that body. From the creation of the Shura Council in 1980 until its abolition in 2014, it was the upper house of the Parliament of Egypt.

List

Sources
  Official website of the Shura Council

Politics of Egypt
Egypt, Shura
Speakers
Presidents